nabim (National Association of British and Irish Flour Millers, now UK Flour Millers) is the British trade industry group that represents the flour industry. The UK flour industry is worth over £1bn, producing around 5 million tonnes of wheat flour a year.

Structure
It is headquartered near Green Park tube station and the Royal Academy of Arts near St James's Street in the City of Westminster. Part of the organization is the Flour Advisory Bureau which advises on recipes with flour.

Alexander Waugh is the Director-General of nabim and the Flour Advisory Bureau.

History
The National Association of British and Irish Flour Millers was founded in 1917. The Flour Advisory Bureau was formed in 1956. 

NABIM was renamed UK Flour Millers in December 2020.

Function
It markets the consumption of wheat flour in the UK.

See also
 Association of Bakery Ingredient Manufacturers
 Federation of Bakers

References

External links
 UK Flour Millers
 Grain Chain
 Flour Advisory Bureau

1917 establishments in the United Kingdom
British research associations
Flour mills in the United Kingdom
Food industry trade groups
Organisations based in the City of Westminster
Organizations established in 1917